BBC Three Counties Radio is the BBC's local radio station serving the counties of Bedfordshire, Hertfordshire and Buckinghamshire.

It broadcasts on FM, DAB, digital TV and via BBC Sounds from studios at Grove Park in Dunstable.

According to RAJAR, the station has a weekly audience of 101,000 listeners and a 4.6% share as of December 2022.

History

BBC Radio Bedfordshire (1985–1993)

The station launched as "Radio Bedfordshire" on 24 June 1985, serving the whole of Bedfordshire plus (despite the name) North Bucks and the northern parts of Hertfordshire. Therefore, as well as Bedford, Luton, Dunstable, Milton Keynes, Knebworth, Berkhamsted, Tring, Harpenden, Leighton Buzzard, Aylesbury, Hemel Hempstead, St Albans, Hatfield, Welwyn Garden City, Letchworth Garden City, Stevenage and Hitchin were served by the new station. In 1992 the station became known as "BBC Radio Bedfordshire with Herts and Bucks".

BBC Three Counties Radio (1993–present)
The station changed to its present name on 5 April 1993. The new name was intended to reflect the wider reach across the three counties and to give equal service to all. The editorial area was not, at that point, expanded but enhanced studio facilities and staff were devoted to Buckinghamshire and Hertfordshire.

New transmitters at Epping Green and Bedmond extended the coverage area to Welwyn Garden City, Hatfield and west Hertfordshire in late 2005.

BBC Three Counties Radio became available on DAB radio on 14 February 2013. In June 2015, the station moved from its Luton base to new studios in Dunstable.

Transmitters 
BBC Three Counties Radio broadcasts on DAB Digital radio on the Herts, Beds and Bucks digital radio multiplex, transmitted from Sandy Heath, Aylesbury TE, Epping Green, Hemel Hempstead, Chepping Wycombe, Letchworth, Zouches Farm and Bow Brickhill.

On FM it broadcasts on 90.4FM (Epping Green, near Hertford), 92.1FM (Bedmond, near Hemel Hempstead), 94.7FM (Quainton Hill, near Aylesbury), 95.5FM (Sandy Heath), 98.0FM (High Wycombe), 103.8FM (Zouches Farm, near Luton), 104.5FM (Bow Brickhill, near Milton Keynes).

In addition, BBC Three Counties Radio also broadcasts on Freeview TV channel 720 in the Western half of the BBC East region and streams online via BBC Sounds.

Programming
Local programming is produced and broadcast from the BBC's Dunstable studios from 6am – 10pm on Sundays – Fridays and from 6am – 1am on Saturdays.

Off-peak programming originates from BBC Radio Suffolk, BBC Radio Norfolk and BBC Radio Northampton. The Saturday late show, broadcast across the eastern counties between 10pm and 1pm, originates from Three Counties Radio and is presented by Justin Dealey.

During the station's downtime, overnight programming is simulcast from BBC Radio 5 Live and BBC Radio London.

Presenters

Notable current presenters include:

Andy Collins (weekday breakfast)
Tony Hadley (Sunday mornings)

Notable past presenters 

Nana Akua
Tony Blackburn
Jon Gaunt
Simon Groom
John Radford
Dave Lee Travis (former Sunday morning presenter)
Stephen Rhodes (former breakfast / consumer show presenter)
Nick Lawrence (former Breakfast Show presenter, ex-Chiltern FM)
Mo Dutta
Iain Lee (former breakfast presenter)

References

External links 

 
 Media UK – BBC Three Counties Radio
 Bow Brickhill transmitter.
 Epping Green transmitter.
 Hemel Hempstead (Bedmond) transmitter.
 High Wycombe transmitter.
 Lewsey Farm transmitter.
 Kempston transmitter.
 Quainton Hill transmitter.
 Sandy Heath transmitter.
 Zouches Farm transmitter.
 Chepping Wycombe Transmitter

BBC Local Radio
Radio stations in Hertfordshire
Radio stations in Bedfordshire
Radio stations in Buckinghamshire
Luton
Hitchin
Flitwick
1985 establishments in England